The electoral district of Ringwood is an electoral district of the Victorian Legislative Assembly, located in the east of Melbourne. It was first proclaimed in 1958 and was abolished in 1992. Some of Ringwood was included in the new electoral district of Bayswater that year. Kay Setches, who was at the time the last member for Ringwood, contested and lost Bayswater at the 1992 election.

The electorate was created again in the 2013 redistribution of electoral boundaries that took effect at the 2014 state election. The new district largely replaces the abolished district of Mitcham, covering suburbs along the eastern parts of the Maroondah Highway. The abolished district of Mitcham was held by Liberal MP Dee Ryall, who lost the seat in a big swing against her in 2018.

As of the 2022 Victorian state election, the seat contains the suburbs of Heathmont, Mitcham, Nunawading, Ringwood East, most of Ringwood, and parts of Blackburn, Blackburn North, Donvale, Forest Hill, and Vermont. The district's boundaries were also adjusted to account for local population changes. Ringwood North was transferred to Warrandyte, while parts of Blackburn, Forest Hill, Vermont, and Heathmont were absorbed into the seat.

Members

Election results

References

External links
 District profile from the Victorian Electoral Commission

Electoral districts of Victoria (Australia)
1958 establishments in Australia
1992 disestablishments in Australia
2014 establishments in Australia
Constituencies established in 1958
Constituencies disestablished in 1992
City of Whitehorse
City of Maroondah
Electoral districts and divisions of Greater Melbourne
Ringwood, Victoria